Big Nate: In the Zone is a realistic fiction novel by American cartoonist Lincoln Peirce. It is based on the comic strip and is the 6th book in the Big Nate novel series. The book was released in 2014 and it is aimed at children aged 8 to 12. It was published by HarperCollins Publishers.

Plot
Nate states that a frozen waffle has "ruined his life" and is currently being yelled at by Principal Nichols because Teddy accidentally destroyed his War of 1812 outline. Nate then retells a dramatic flashback of the day before for the reader to know what happened. In the flashback, Mrs. Godfrey gives everyone an assignment to write a report on the War of 1812, which is due tomorrow. Teddy helps him due to his dad being a history geek. Nate soon forgets to bring the outline to his house, and he calls Teddy and sure enough, Teddy said he would take good care of it. But the next morning, he decides to eat a frozen waffle with maple syrup over cereal, and he spills the maple syrup all over the outline and attempts to make the maple syrup was off the paper, but this just makes it ruined even more and turned it into a "soggy, syrupy pile of confetti," defined by Nate. Nate finds an empty plastic bottle and starts bonking himself with it on his forehead. Mrs. Godfrey makes Nate dispose of it, but Nate tries to throw it in the trash can, which makes it bounce on the trash can and hit Principal Nichols, spilling a drink the principal was holding all over Principal Nichols by accident. During the past week, he has had a terrible case of bad luck, including failing grades, cavities, and being easily made fun of. Later, after Nate fails to turn in his outline, he is tasked with completing another one.

After finishing, he notices his crush, Jenny, and her boyfriend, Artur, who are rather obnoxiously displaying love. An envious Nate then makes a list of horrible pet names and insults that he feels Artur should be called, including "Fart Bucket" "Nate Wanna-be", "Weasel Boy", "Booger Bunny", "Soon-to-be former boyfriend", and much more. Chad appears and notices Nate. After being asked what he was working on, Nate lies quickly and says he was about to start an "Ultra-Nate" comic. Chad requests to also be in the book. Chad, who has a crush on Maya, asks Nate if she could be saved by him. Nate finishes the comic and is prompted by Chad to start thinking about life with superpowers.

The bad luck, however makes Nate suppose he could theoretically simulate landing after flying. Nate jumps off a table and on to a beanbag, bursting it wide open. Nate is then yelled at for the third time of the day. Nate and Chad are given detention and asked to fix the beanbag chair. While fixing it, the home economics teacher, Mrs. Brindle, instead of serving cookies ore other desserts, which she normally does, she serves stuffed cabbage rolls because the school is holding a fitness zone. After they are done, they notice that due to the new program, all the snacks in the vending machine have been stocked with health foods. Their friend, Dee Dee, shows up and says that Nate has to report to the principal's office. Nate arrives and is greeted by Nichols. Nichols states that the fitness zone needs to be welcomed in a popular way: music. Nichols then asks Nate to create a song out of the rules of the fitness zone. Nichols also cancels Nate and Chad's detentions, due to the fact that Nate and Chad have a role in their band, Enslave The Mollusk. 

After school, ETM (Enslave The Mollusk) creates a rock anthem called "You're Never Alone In The Fitness Zone," key of C. When Artur is assigned to take the rules and convert them to lyrics, Nate's terrible luck causes Artur to notice the list of pet names, resulting in him quitting out of embarrassment. Without a lead singer, ETM has to choose between Nate, Francis (both have "natural disasters" for voices) and Teddy (not skilled enough to sing and play at the same time). They choose on Nate, him having an edge over Francis. The next day, Nate comes down with nerves and forgets the lyrics, forcing Francis to take over as the singer, making ETM a laughingstock. They are especially teased by a popular 7th-grader named Marcus Goode. The next week, report cards get sent home, with Nate getting an unacceptable grade in Social Studies (technically a D). 

However, he is then given a lucky foot charm by Chad, which he refers to as "the Foot" he found in the cafeteria. Immediately, good luck happens everywhere in Nate's life. He is able to shoot a hoop that barely touches the net from mid-court, backwards, and with his eyes closed, a math test is postponed due to Mr. Staples photocopying the wrong quiz and the copy machine being broken, a free period is given to Nate at Science when Mr. Galvin fell ill, so he went home, and he is given $20 by some lady, all because he found her necklace in the grass.

Unfortunately for Nate's luck, Maya is shown to be going out with Marcus, which ends up making Chad heartbroken. Later, Nate finds out he has to go back home, as Nate's dad wants to discuss on his report card. However, he then reveals one of his report cards back then, when he was not exactly a "honor roll student". But Nate's dad still gives him a punishment of no drawing comics before bed. Nate loopholes around this and he finds out that his dad did not prevent him to draw on his sneakers. The stylized sneakers make him more popular than Marcus, causing Marcus to be very envious of Nate. Over the next week, Nate becomes "in the zone". He is asked to sign other kids' sneakers, his punishment is canceled, he is the MVP of back-to-back shutouts in soccer, and gets perfect scores on all his tests. However, he realizes is becoming like Artur. Nate mentally digresses and asks Artur to rejoin ETM. After successfully inviting Artur back, they run into Coach Calhoun, who tells them about Field Day. Marcus and Maya appear and Marcus makes a bet that 6th-grade will not win a single event on Field Day as well as calling Chad "Superchunk." Maya steps up angrily and tells Marcus to stop, stating "What's he ever done to you!?" then breaking up with Marcus. Nate then gives the Foot to Chad so he can try to hook up with a remorseful Maya.

However, the luck stops, as in a turn of events, the Foot ends up in Mrs. Godfrey's desk due to Mrs. Godfrey thinking it's a "toy" after finding it in Chad's hand. On Field Day, the 6th-graders are given the sports they are the worst at, and Gina is captain of the 6th graders. Nate has to do the 60 meter hurdles, and though he was able to gain a head start, he trips over the last hurdle, causing his competitor, Kareem Trillin, to win. The last sport is the three-legged race. Nate and Artur team up to make sure that Chad and Maya are a team. Soon, because Marcus and his partner, Jakob, do not work together, while Maya and Chad do, Nate wins the bet. The next week, an assembly is announced to give ETM a second chance. Before playing, Nate reveals that if he lost the bet, it would be a nightmare-- he would become a mini Marcus for a week. He also states that Marcus is about to be defamed. The song is a success, and Marcus is humiliated in front of the school with Chad hitting Marcus' head with a bottle and Nate states that he and his pals do not need the lucky foot when their show is currently a hit.

Characters
Nate Wright: a rebellious 6th-grader and the main protagonist.
Chad Applewhite: a friend of Nate and one of Nate's good friends.
Marcus Goode: a bully 7th-grader and the main antagonist.
Teddy Ortiz: a best friend of Nate.
Maya: the love interest of Chad.
Artur Pashkov: the singer of ETM and Jenny's exchange student boyfriend.
Francis Pope: Nate's best friend.
Jenny Jenkins: Artur's girlfriend and the girl whom Nate has a crush on, though she finds Nate to be completely annoying and bothering.

References

American children's novels
2014 American novels
2014 children's books
Big Nate
HarperCollins books